Stichaeidae, the pricklebacks or shannies, are a family of marine ray-finned fishes in the suborder Zoarcoidei of the order Scorpaeniformes. Most species are found in the North Pacific Ocean with a few in the North Atlantic Ocean.

Taxonomy
Stichaeidae was first proposed as a family in 1864 by the American zoologist Theodore Gill, although he called it the Stichaeoidae. The 5th edition of Fishes of the World classifies this family within the suborder Zoarcoidei, within the order Scorpaeniformes. Other authorities classify this family in the infraorder Zoarcales wihin the suborder Cottoidei of the Perciformes because removing the Scorpaeniformes from the Perciformes renders that taxon non monophyletic.

Fishes of the World mentions six subfamilies but does not assign genera to the subfamilies while other authorities split the Cebidichthyidae, Opisthocentridae, Lumpenidae and Neozoarcidae from the Sitchaeidae as valid families. The genera which are classified within the family Eulophiidae were also previously included within the Stichaeidae.

Subfamilies and genera
The family Stichaeidae is classified into subfamilies and genera as follows († means extinct):

Catalog of Fishes classifies these fishes as follows:

Etymology
The name of the family comes from that of its type genus Stichaeus, which means “set in a row”, which may be an allusion to the row of black spots on the dorsal fins of the species in that genus.

Characteristics
Stichaeidae is characterised by having an elongate body which is a little compressed. They have a very long dorsal fin which typically contains a large number of sharp spines, giving rise to the common name of prickleback, there may e some spines at the rear of the dorsal fin. The anal fin is long which has its origin closer to the head than to the tail, or halfway between the head and tail. The pectoral fins may be very small varying in size up to very large and fan shaped fins and contain between 2 and 21 rays. The normally present small pelvic fins are located to the front of the pectoral fins,  and have a single spine and between 1 and four rays. There are no appendages on the head although some species have a crest and there is a single pair of nostrils. The body is typically covered with small, overlapping scales but the head, other than the cheeks, is normally lacking scales. The sensory canals on the head are typically well developed; there are normally 6 preopercular pores and 4 mandibular pores. There may be two lateral lines which can vary from a hardly noticeable row of neuromasts to consisting of one or more canals which can have complex branching. Their teeth are small  and may be incisor-like or conical in shape. In the majority of species the gill membranes are widely joined and separate from the isthmus. Most species have a siphon on the operculum. They usually have a pyloric caeca but not a swim bladder. They have ribs.

Distribution and habitat
Stichaeidae is found in the North Pacific, North Atlantic, and Arctic oceans, with the majority of species in the North Pacific.

References

 
 

Zoarcoidei